8TV , formerly known as TD8 and then Citytv, is a Catalan language private TV station based in Barcelona, Spain. The channel is run by OC 2022.

History
8TV began as a local TV channel in Barcelona in 2001. In its early years, the station used the Citytv name and brand identity, similar to the Citytv system of television stations in Canada and licensed to Grupo Godó by then-owner of the brand, CHUM Limited.

Officially limited to inner Barcelona, it slowly expanded its coverage to the suburbs of the city, as well as other important places such as Girona or Lleida.

In 2003, Emissions Digitals de Catalunya (Digital Broadcasting of Catalonia), won a bid for a digital license to broadcast in all Catalonia,  (DVB-T). As the Godó group was part of this commercial bid, Citytv could (by law) broadcast as a de facto Catalonia-wide station, but only in digital.

As the first launch of Digital terrestrial television in Catalan Countries in 2003 did not succeed, most television channels decided to postpone any further plans to broadcast in digital. Consequently,  Citytv continued to expand its analogue coverage in the following years. For all this, it was not until March 2005 that Citytv began broadcasting in DVB-T in March 2005 (restricted to Barcelona).

With a steady relaunch of Digital terrestrial television in November 2005, the channel's owners decided to rename Citytv to 8TV and become a private Catalan broadcaster.

On 27 February 2006, the channel was renamed TD8 (Televisió Digital 8 "Digital Television 8"), and began broadcasting to all Catalonia (in analogue). Initial digital coverage was limited to Barcelona, but on 4 April 2006 TD8 was also available in Tarragona, Girona and Lleida. Later that year, TD8 was once again renamed 8TV- vuit televisió (eight television).

Programming 
The station broadcasts a mixture of old films, entertainment (Arucitys; Envasat al 8; X-tra; Amics, coneguts i saludats), news (Notícies 8 ), sports (Força Barça), cartoons (Garfield & Xou de Lupo i DuesEspatlles). Most programs are broadcast in Catalan, but foreign films and series are dubbed in Spanish.

One original program on the station was Notícies 10, airing at 8:25 pm.

See also
 8TV (disambiguation) - other channels named 8TV

External links
 8TV

Catalan-language television stations
Television stations in Catalonia
Television channels and stations established in 2001
2001 establishments in Catalonia
Mass media in Barcelona